Harrah is a town in Yakima County, Washington, United States. The population was 585 at the 2020 census. It is on the Yakama Indian Reservation. The mayor is Barbara Harrer.

History
Named after Julius Harrah, Harrah was officially incorporated on January 23, 1946. In 1950 it had a population of 297.

Geography
Harrah is located at  (46.404182, -120.542982).

Demographics

2010 census
As of the census of 2010, there were 625 people, 177 households, and 142 families living in the town. The racial makeup of the town was 24.6% White, 0.5% African American, 21.3% Native American, 0.2% Asian, 48.3% from other races, and 5.1% from two or more races. Hispanic or Latino of any race were 55.4% of the population.

There were 177 households, of which 49.7% had children under the age of 18 living with them, 57.1% were married couples living together, 12.4% had a female householder with no husband present, 10.7% had a male householder with no wife present, and 19.8% were non-families. 16.4% of all households were made up of individuals, and 6.3% had someone living alone who was 65 years of age or older. The average household size was 3.53 and the average family size was 3.89.

The median age in the town was 29.2 years. 32.5% of residents were under the age of 18; 11.7% were between the ages of 18 and 24; 27.1% were from 25 to 44; 19.8% were from 45 to 64; and 8.8% were 65 years of age or older. The gender makeup of the town was 48.3% male and 51.7% female.

2000 census
As of the census of 2000, there were 542 people, 167 households, and 131 families living in the town. The racial makeup of the town was 40.59% White, 0.37% African American, 19.19% Native American, 0.37% Asian, 33.03% from other races, and 6.46% from two or more races. Hispanic or Latino of any race were 44.10% of the population.

There were 167 households, out of which 48.5% had children under the age of 18 living with them, 61.7% were married couples living together, 12.6% had a female householder with no husband present, and 21.0% were non-families. 18.6% of all households were made up of individuals, and 7.8% had someone living alone who was 65 years of age or older. The average household size was 3.25 and the average family size was 3.72.

In the town, the age distribution of the population shows 38.0% under the age of 18, 6.6% from 18 to 24, 26.4% from 25 to 44, 20.1% from 45 to 64, and 8.9% who were 65 years of age or older. The median age was 29 years. For every 100 females, there were 106.9 males. For every 100 females age 18 and over, there were 100.0 males.

The median income for a household in the town was $36,875, and the median income for a family was $41,250. Males had a median income of $31,250 versus $25,000 for females. The per capita income for the town was $12,721. About 14.5% of families and 19.8% of the population were below the poverty line, including 29.0% of those under age 18 and 16.4% of those age 65 or over.

School District
Harrah is part of School Dist. No. 209, also known as the Mt. Adams School District. It operates Harrah Elementary in Harrah and Mount Adams Middle School and White Swan High School in White Swan.

References

Towns in Washington (state)
Towns in Yakima County, Washington